The Heath & Normy Show was an Australian radio program that featured on Triple M Sydney every Monday to Friday between 9:30 pm and midnight, and on Triple M Adelaide on Sunday evenings. It originally debuted in July 2009. The Heath & Normy Show can be followed via various social networking sites and their official blog.

The duo began their radio career in 2003 at Charles Sturt University on the campus radio station 2MCE. Weekday nights was their usual shift, until the station boss suspended them for talking over advertisements. Their reasoning was that they could sell the products in the ads better than the "professional" recordings. After repeated warnings, Heath & Normy were booted from their time slot, only to print posters of their dismissal letter and post it around the university campus with the headline, "Bring back Heath and Normy!”. To which they were swiftly reinstated.

Both debuted on commercial radio after winning a radio show contest known as "semi pro radio" on the Triple M network in 2009. Heath and Normy then went on to host the night show at Triple M Sydney every Monday to Friday, with Producer Travis Roebuck. The boys were then offered a breakfast show in Albury which they hosted for 2 years. During this time, Heath & Normy also hosted a nationally broadcast show on the Austereo network called, "Top Mates", which they recorded out of its Albury studio. In that time, they won two Australian Commercial Radio Awards, one for 'Best Show' and the other for 'Best New Talent'. In late 2012, they were approached by Nova Entertainment to host a breakfast show on the Central Coast, instead choosing the breakfast gig at NXFM from 6-9am, which they hosted from early 2013 until their contract ended in late 2015. When Heath was asked live on-air (during the Sophie, Heath & Normy show) what he thought of commercial radio, he famously replied, "Commercial radio is a tough, tough listen. There isn’t one show I’d tune in to, to be honest. I wouldn’t even listen to this show if I didn't have to, with all the ads and rubbish music we play. But I literally have to listen to it through my headphones every morning".

Heath and Normy also had a hit podcast during 2017, entitled "How To, with Heath and Normy". The show featured previously on Barry.

Personalities
The Heath & Normy Show featured Sydney comic Heath Piper and copywriter Normy Dorrell. Both attended Blaxland High School and University of Sydney together.

Other work 
The duo participated in a local Charles Sturt University radio program during their studies in 2004. In 2009 Heath & Normy filmed a pilot television episode titled 'Mannerism' for the Seven Network, through Cornerbox Productions, Sydney. The Heath & Normy Show can be followed via various social networking sites and their official blog. Both debuted after winning a radio show contest known as "semi pro radio" on the Triple M network in 2009.

References

External links 
 
 YouTube – The Heath and Normy Show
 Heath & Normy blogspot

Australian comedy duos
Australian radio personalities